Walter is a 2020 Indian Tamil-language crime action film written and directed by U. Anbarasan and produced by Shruthi Thilak. The film stars Sibi Sathyaraj,  Nataraj, Samuthirakani, Riythvika, Sanam Shetty, Munishkanth and Shirin Kanchwala. The principal photography of the film commenced in June 2019, and the film was released on 13 March 2020.

Plot 
DSP Walter IPS (Sibiraj), who plays the titular role as a policeman, gets the mandatory yet routine hero introduction scene when a protest turns violent in Kumbakonam. Later, he takes up the case of a couple who seeks his help to find their newborn baby. Walter suspects foul play when he comes across similar cases, and sets out to investigate the crimes, accompanied by his subordinate Paneerselvam (Charle). Meanwhile, the ego clash between Eshwaramoorthi (Bava Chelladurai), a leading politician in the town, and Bala (Samuthirakani), who is considered to be his successor, intensifies. Their ego clash brings Balu's friend Arjun (Nataraj), who is linked to the children who have gone missing, into the picture. How Walter faces several obstacles in his attempt to stop a criminal syndicate forms the rest of the story.

Cast

Production 
In September 2018, it was announced that U. Anbarasan would make his directorial debut through a police film titled Walter and had cast Vikram Prabhu, Arjun and Jackie Shroff in the lead roles. Produced by Madukkur Movie Makers, the movie was set to have music composed by Radhan. However, the project was later shelved.

The film restarted in 2019 with new producers, and Sibi Sathyaraj was cast in the lead role, with Gautham Vasudev Menon and Samuthirakani also part of the cast. Menon later backed out and was replaced by Natarajan Subramaniam. The shooting of the film started from June 2019 in and around Kumbakonam and Thanjavur. Rasamathi, Elaiyaraja, Dharma Prakash, and Vicky were signed up as cinematographer, editor, music director, and stunt master, respectively.

Soundtrack

Release
The satellite rights are held by Sun TV and digital rights is available in Sun NXT.

References

External links

2020s Tamil-language films
2020 crime thriller films
Indian action thriller films
Indian crime thriller films
Indian crime action films
2020 films
2020 action thriller films
2020 crime action films
2020 directorial debut films